Popovka is a rural locality (a village) and the administrative center of Azletskoye Rural Settlement, Kharovsky District, Vologda Oblast, Russia. The population was 139 as of 2002.

Geography 
Popovka is located 52 km northwest of Kharovsk (the district's administrative centre) by road. Ostretsovskaya is the nearest rural locality.

References 

Rural localities in Kharovsky District